Francesca Schiavone was the defending champion, but lost in the first round to Beatriz García Vidagany.

María Teresa Torró Flor won the tournament, defeating Romina Oprandi in the final, 6–3, 3–6, 6–3. In doing so, Torró Flor won her first WTA singles title.

Seeds

Draw

Finals

Top half

Bottom half

Qualifying

Seeds

Qualifiers

Lucky loser

Draw

First qualifier

Second qualifier

Third qualifier

Fourth qualifier

References 
 Main draw
 Qualifying draw

Grand Prix SAR La Princesse Lalla Meryem Singles
2014 Women's Singles
2014 in Moroccan tennis